The 2018–19 Akron Zips women's basketball team represents the University of Akron during the 2018–19 NCAA Division I women's basketball season. The Zips, led by first year head coach Melissa Jackson, play their home games at the James A. Rhodes Arena as members of the East Division of the Mid-American Conference. They finished the season 16–15, 7–11 in MAC play to finish in fifth place in the East Division. They lost in the first round of the MAC women's tournament to Eastern Washington. They received an invite to the WBI where they lost in the first round to Tennessee Tech.

Roster

Schedule

|-
!colspan=9 style=| Exhibition

|-
!colspan=9 style=| Non-conference regular season

|-
!colspan=9 style=| MAC regular season

|-
!colspan=9 style=| MAC Women's Tournament

|-
!colspan=9 style=| WBI

See also
2018–19 Akron Zips men's basketball team

References

2017-18
2018–19 Mid-American Conference women's basketball season
2018 in sports in Ohio
2019 in sports in Ohio
Akron